Selim II (Ottoman Turkish: سليم ثانى Selīm-i sānī, ; 28 May 1524 – 15 December 1574), also known as Selim the Blond or Selim the Drunk, was the Sultan of the Ottoman Empire from 1566 until his death in 1574. He was a son of Suleiman the Magnificent and his wife Hurrem Sultan. Selim had been an unlikely candidate for the throne until his brother Mehmed died of smallpox, his half-brother Mustafa was strangled to death by the order of his father, his brother Cihangir succumbed to chronic health issues, and his brother Bayezid was killed on the order of his father after a rebellion against Selim. Selim died on 15 December 1574 and was buried in Hagia Sophia.

Early life
Selim was  born in Constantinople (Istanbul), on 28 May 1524, during the reign of his father Suleiman the Magnificent. His mother was Hurrem Sultan, a slave and concubine who was born an Orthodox priest's daughter in contemporary Ukraine, and later was freed and became Suleiman's legal wife.

In 1543, at Manisa, Selim took as concubine Nurbanu Sultan, whose background is disputed. She was the mother of Murad III, Selim's successor. Selim legally married Nurbanu, just like his father married his mother.

Reign
Selim II gained the throne after palace intrigue and fraternal dispute, succeeding as sultan on the 7th of September 1566. Selim's Grand Vizier, Mehmed Sokollu and wife, Nurbanu Sultan, a native of what is now Bosnia and Herzegovina, controlled much of state affairs, and two years after Selim's accession succeeded in concluding at Constantinople a treaty (17 February 1568) with the Habsburg Holy Roman Emperor, Maximilian II, whereby the Emperor agreed to pay an annual "present" of 30,000 ducats and granted the Ottomans authority in Moldavia and Walachia. Gazanfer Agha (d. 1602), a friend to Selim and to the writer Mustafa Ali, was castrated so he could serve in Selim's harem. (Gazanfer's younger brother Cafer was also castrated, but did not survive.)

A plan had been prepared in Constantinople for uniting the Volga and Don by a canal in order to counter Russian expansion toward the Ottomans' northern frontier. In the summer of 1569 a large force of Janissaries and cavalry were sent to lay siege to Astrakhan and begin the canal works, while an Ottoman fleet besieged Azov. However, a sortie from the Astrakhan garrison drove back the besiegers. A Russian relief army of 15,000 attacked and scattered the workmen and the Tatar force sent for their protection. The Ottoman fleet was then destroyed by a storm. Early in 1570 the ambassadors of Ivan IV of Russia concluded at Istanbul a treaty that restored friendly relations between the Sultan and the Tsar.

Expeditions in the Hejaz and Yemen were more successful, but the conquest of Cyprus in 1571, led to the naval defeat against Spain and Italian states in the Battle of Lepanto in the same year.

At the historic Battle of Naupaktos or Battle of Lepanto, on 7 October 1571, the Holy League defeated the Ottoman navy decisively; the Holy League sank or destroyed 50 Ottoman ships and captured 117 galleys and 20 galliots, 30,000 Turks were lost in battle, 10,000 Turks were taken prisoners, and many thousands of Christian slaves were rescued. The Holy League lost about 7,500 men.

The Empire's shattered fleets were soon restored (in just six months, it consisted of about 150 galleys and eight galleasses), and the Ottomans maintained control of the eastern Mediterranean (1573). In August 1574, months before Selim's death, the Ottomans regained control of Tunis from Spain, which had captured it in 1572.
 
Selim is known for restoring Mahidevran Hatun's status and her wealth. He also built the tomb of his eldest brother, Şehzade Mustafa, who was executed in 1553.

During the reign of Selim, the Janissaries began to increase their power at the expense of the sultan. "Accession money" demanded by the Janissaries had increased; they used their power to gain more benefits for their personal lives instead of improving the state. Janissaries were now able to marry and were allowed to enrol their sons in the Corps.

In the famine of 1573, caused by severe cold, the farmers were unable to produce food for the people. Selim gave people food and vegetables in the food kitchen.  In April 1574, a fire started in the printing house of Topkapi Palace, killing many cooks, servants and maids.

Character

Selim is introduced as a generous monarch who is fond of pleasure and entertainment in the sources of the period, who is fond of drink councils, enjoys the presence of scholars and poets around him, as well as musicians. However, it is stated that he did not appear much in public, and that his father often went to Friday prayer and out among the public; Selim neglected this and spent his time in the palace.

Family
Selim's only wife, Nurbanu Sultan, was the mother of his successor Murad III and almost certainly of all his daughters. As a Haseki Sultan she received 1.100 aspers (silver coins) a day, while lower-ranking concubines who were the mothers of princes received 40 aspers a day. When Selim married her legally, he bestowed upon Nurbanu 110,000 ducats as a dowry, surpassing the 100,000 ducats that his father bestowed upon his mother Hürrem Sultan.

Consorts
 Nurbanu Sultan, Haseki, legal wife and mother and Valide Sultan of Murad III;
 unknown concubines, mothers of the other sons.

Sons
Selim had at least seven sons:
 Murad III (Manisa, 4 July 1546-Constantinople, 15 January 1595. Buried in his mausoleum in the Hagia Sophia Mosque). Son of Nurbanu Sultan, he succeeded his father as sultan.
 Şehzade Mehmed (Constantinople, 1571 - Constantinople, 1572. Buried in the Hürrem Sultan mausoleum). Infant died of natural causes.
 Şehzade Süleyman (Constantinople, 1571-Constantinople, 22 December 1574, buried with his father). Executed by Murad III on his accession to the throne. His mother later committed suicide.
 Şehzade Abdullah (Constantinople, 1571-Constantinople, 22 December 1574, buried with his father). Executed by Murad III on his accession to the throne.
 Şehzade Ali (Constantinople, 1572 - Constantinople, 1572, buried with his father). Died shortly after birth with his mother.
 Şehzade Osman (Constantinople, 1573-Constantinople, 22 December 1574, buried with his father). Executed by Murad III on his accession to the throne. His mother died shortly after his birth.
 Şehzade Cihangir (Constantinople, 1574-Constantinople, 22 December 1574, buried with his father). Executed by Murad III on his accession to the throne. His mother died shortly after his birth.

Daughters
Selim had at least four daughters:
Şah Sultan (Manisa, 1544 – Costantinople, 3 November 1580, buried in Zal Mahmud Paşa Mausoleum, Eyüp), daughter with Nurbanu Sultan, married firstly in 1562 to Çakırcıbaşı Hasan Pasha, married secondly in 1574 to Zal Mahmud Pasha;
Gevherhan Sultan (Manisa, 1544 or 1545 - Costantinople, after 1623, buried in Selim II Mausoleum, Hagia Sophia Mosque), daughter with Nurbanu Sultan, married firstly in 1562 to Piyale Pasha, married secondly in 1579 to Cerrah Mehmed Pasha;
Ismihan Sultan (Manisa, 1545 – Costantinople, 8 August 1585, buried in Selim II Mausoleum, Hagia Sophia Mosque), daughter with Nurbanu Sultan, married firstly in 1562 to Sokollu Mehmed Pasha, married secondly in 1584 to Kalaylıkoz Ali Pasha;
Fatma Sultan (1559 – Costantinople, October 1580, buried in Selim II Mausoleum, Hagia Sophia Mosque), daughter with Nurbanu Sultan (disputed), married in 1573 to Kanijeli Siyavuş Pasha;

References

Sources
 Finkel, Caroline, Osman's Dream, Basic Books, 2005.

Further reading
 Ancestry of Sultana Nur-Banu (Cecilia Venier-Baffo)
 John Julius Norwich, A History of Venice (1989),

External links

 Selim II Tomb

[aged 50]

1524 births
1574 deaths
Royalty from Istanbul
16th-century Ottoman sultans
Suleiman the Magnificent

Ottoman people of the Ottoman–Persian Wars
Turks from the Ottoman Empire
Custodian of the Two Holy Mosques